Adelaide di Borgogna, ossia Ottone, re d'Italia (Adelaide of Burgundy, or Otto, King of Italy) is a two-act opera composed by Gioachino Rossini (with contributions by Michele Carafa) to a libretto by Giovanni Schmidt. It was premièred at the Teatro Argentina in Rome on 27 December 1817.

Performance history
20th century and beyond

Performances have included concert versions with Della Jones as Ottone and Eiddwen Harrhy as Adelaide given at London's Queen Elizabeth Hall in November 1978, and another at Usher Hall in Edinburgh on 19 August 2005 with the Scottish Chamber Orchestra and Chorus with Jennifer Larmore as Ottone and Majella Cullagh as Adelaide.

The Festival della Valle d'Itria in Martina Franca in Italy presented staged performances in August 1984, with Ottone sung by Martine Dupuy and Adelaide by Mariella Devia.  In addition, the Rossini Opera Festival staged it in Pesaro in August 2006, with Daniela Barcellona and Patrizia Ciofi singing the roles of Ottone and Adelaide respectively and it was presented again in a new production in 2011, also with Barcellona as well as Jessica Pratt in the title role.

Roles

Recordings

References

Further reading
Gossett, Philip; Patricia Brauner, in Amanda Holden (Ed.) (2001), The New Penguin Opera Guide, New York: Penguin Putnam. 
Osborne, Charles (1994), The Bel Canto Operas of Rossini, Donizetti, and Bellini, Portland, Oregon: Amadeus Press. 
Osborne, Richard, Rossini, Ithaca, New York: Northeastern University Press, 1990 
Osborne, Richard, "Adelaide di Borgogna", in Stanley Sadie, (ed.), The New Grove Dictionary of Opera, Vol. One. p. 19. London: Macmillan, 1998

External links

Synopsis https://www.rossinioperafestival.it/en/stories/adelaide-di-borgogna/

Operas
Operas set in Italy
1817 operas
Italian-language operas
Operas by Gioachino Rossini